Chaplain (Major General) Donald William Shea, USA (April 15, 1936 – May 18, 2016) was an American Army officer who served as the 19th Chief of Chaplains of the United States Army from 1994 to 1999.

Shea went to seminary at the Saint Paul Seminary School of Divinity in St. Paul, MN. Ordained a priest for the Roman Catholic Diocese of Helena in 1962, Brigadier General Shea was granted the honorary title of monsignor by Pope John Paul II in 1991. He was designated a protonotary apostolic supernumerary in 2002 after his military retirement and return to Montana in 1999.

Awards and decorations

Gallery

References

External links

1936 births
2016 deaths
United States Army personnel of the Vietnam War
Vietnam War chaplains
United States Army generals
Deputy Chiefs of Chaplains of the United States Army
Chiefs of Chaplains of the United States Army
Recipients of the Distinguished Service Medal (US Army)
Recipients of the Legion of Merit
Recipients of the Air Medal
Recipients of the Meritorious Service Medal (United States)
20th-century American Roman Catholic priests